Return to Never Land (also known as Peter Pan in: Return to Never Land and later retitled Peter Pan II: Return to Never Land on current home video release) is a 2002 American animated adventure fantasy film produced by Disney MovieToons and Walt Disney Television Animation. A sequel to Walt Disney Feature Animation's 1953 film Peter Pan (in turn based on J. M. Barrie's 1904 stage play Peter Pan; or, the Boy Who Wouldn't Grow Up), the film follows Wendy's daughter who refuses to believe in her mother's story during the Blitz in London, only to be mistakenly brought to Neverland by the pirates. In order for her to get home, she meets Peter Pan, Tinker Bell and the Lost Boys who encourage her to fly and make her believe. The film stars the voices of Harriet Owen, Blayne Weaver, Corey Burton, Jeff Bennett, Kath Soucie, Spencer Breslin, and Bradley Pierce.

The film was released on February 15, 2002, by Walt Disney Pictures, and grossed $115 million against $20 million.

Plot
Many decades after the events of the first film, Wendy Darling is now grown up, married to a man named Edward, and has two children, Jane and Danny. With World War II raging, Edward leaves his family to fight, leaving Wendy to take care of the children. Jane becomes a very serious girl and, unlike her younger brother, refuses to believe in stories about Peter Pan and Neverland, referring to them as "poppycock". This ultimately leads to a furious argument with her mother and brother.

One evening, Wendy tells Jane and Danny that all the children in London will soon be evacuated to the countryside for their safety due to Nazi Germany's bombing of the city by the Luftwaffe. Later that evening, Peter's arch-nemesis, Captain Hook, and his pirate crew arrive on his pixie-dust enchanted ship and kidnaps Jane, mistaking her for Wendy, and takes her to Neverland, where they plan to feed Jane to an octopus in order to lure Peter into a trap. However, Peter rescues Jane, and Hook escapes from the disgruntled octopus, returning to the ship. After Peter learns that Jane is Wendy's daughter, he takes her to his hideout to be the mother of the Lost Boys as Wendy once was, but Jane refuses. The following day, as the boys fail to teach Jane about flying, she angrily snaps at them and proclaims her disbelief in fairies, causing Tinker Bell to not fly and her light starts to fade. This gives Hook an idea to lure Jane to him, and then kidnap Peter.

That evening, Hook finds Jane and promises her that he "wouldn't harm a single hair on [Peter's] head" if she helps him find the treasure that Peter and the Lost Boys stole. Hook gives Jane a whistle to signal him when she finds it and leaves. Jane asks Peter and the boys to play a game of "treasure hunt", and they teach Jane how to act like a Lost Boy, hoping to get her to believe in fairies and save Tinker Bell's life. Jane finds the treasure and changes her mind, discarding the whistle. The boys make her a "Lost Girl", before Tootles finds and blows the whistle, inadvertently alerting the pirates, who capture the boys and expose Jane as their accomplice. Jane tries to convince Peter that it was a misunderstanding, but he berates her for her deception and reveals that her disbelief in fairies is causing Tinker Bell's light to fade.

Horrified, Jane runs back to the hideout to find Tinker Bell's body. Jane is devastated, thinking the fairy is dead forever, but with Jane's new belief, Tinker Bell is revived. They head to the ship and see Hook forcing Peter to walk the plank. With Tinker Bell's help, Jane learns to fly. As Peter uses the anchor to sink the ship, the pirates, riding on a rowboat, are pursued by the octopus. After saying goodbye to the boys, Peter escorts Jane back home, where she reconciles with Wendy and Danny. Peter and Tinker Bell meet with Wendy again, then fly back to Neverland as Edward returns home and reunites with his family.

Voice cast
 Harriet Owen as Jane, Wendy and Edward's daughter, and Danny's older sister who refuses to believe in stories, but changes her mind with Peter’s help. Lianne Hughes served as the supervising animator for Jane. 
 Owen also voiced Young Wendy.
 Blayne Weaver as Peter Pan, the leader of the Lost Boys, friend of Jane, and Wendy’s former playmate who protects Neverland and its inhabitants. Pieter Lommerse and Andrew Collins served as the supervising animators for Peter Pan.
 Corey Burton as Captain Hook, the captain of the pirates and Peter’s arch-nemesis. Bob Baxter served as the supervising animator for Captain Hook.
 Burton would later reprise his role in the TV series Jake and the Neverland Pirates along with Bennett
 Jeff Bennett as Mr. Smee, Hook's clumsy and innocent first mate.
 Bennett, along with Burton would reprise his role in the TV series Jake and the Neverland Pirates
 Kath Soucie as Wendy Darling, Jane and Danny's mother, Michael and John's older sister, Edward's wife, and Peter's former playmate. Ryan O'Loughlin served as the supervising animator for Wendy Darling. Kathryn Beaumont, who voiced Wendy in the original, recorded all of her dialogues for the sequel, but Soucie replaced her as Beaumont's voice had aged.
 Andrew McDonough as Daniel, nicknamed Danny, Wendy and Edward's son and Jane's younger brother who believes in his mother’s stories of Peter Pan.
 Roger Rees as Edward, a surviving soldier, Wendy's husband, and Jane and Danny's father. Rees would later serve as co-playwright for another Peter Pan project, the stage adaptation of Peter and the Starcatcher.
 The Lost Boys, Peter's best friends:
 Spencer Breslin as Cubby, a lost boy in a bear costume.
 Bradley Pierce as Nibs, a lost boy in a rabbit costume.
 Quinn Beswick as Slightly, a lost boy in a fox costume.
 Aaron Spann as Twins, the lost boys in raccoon costumes.
 Tootles, a mute lost boy in a skunk costume.
 Frank Welker as The Octopus who seeks to consume Captain Hook, similar to the Crocodile.

Production
Disney MovieToons/Disney Video Premiere developed the project and then assigned the work for Peter and Jane to Disney Animation Canada. The film was a Peter Pan sequel originally designed as its first theatrical release. In fall 1999, the Canadian unit stopped work on what was then a video release. With Canada's closure, the work on Peter and Jane was instead moved to the Walt Disney Animation Australia and Walt Disney Animation Japan units. Cornerstone Animation was then contracted to do animation direction. The film moved back to a Disney MovieToons theatrical release. Due to the controversy of the first film, the Native-Americans are completely absent in the sequel, but it does show their teepees and totem poles in one sequence. Also following these changes, the mermaids are given brassieres since their appearances in its predecessor were considered sexualized.

Music
Several original songs were written for the film: "I'll Try" (Jonatha Brooke, which is put into three different versions. A short version heard at the beginning of the film, a reprise; which is also in the film, and a full version; which is heard in the end credits), "Here We Go Another Plan" (Jeff Bennett), 	and "So to Be One of Us"/"Now that You're One of Us" (They Might Be Giants).

The song "Second Star to the Right" from the original film is covered by Jonatha Brooke. The soundtrack also includes a cover of "Do You Believe in Magic" by BBMak.

Songs
Original songs performed in the film include:

Reception

Box office
The film opened at the third position at the box office behind Crossroads and John Q with $11.9 million. Return to Never Land grossed $48.4 million domestically and $66.7 million overseas, for a worldwide gross of $112.1 million, against a production budget of $20 million. It was before DVD sales, which had been the initially planned market for the film.

Critical response
On review aggregator website Rotten Tomatoes the film has an approval rating of 45% based on 97 reviews, and an average rating of 5.5/10. The site's critical consensus reads, "With its forgettable songs and lackluster story, this new Pan will surely entertain kids, but will feel more like a retread to adults." On Metacritic, the film has a weighted average score of 49 out of 100, based on 26 critics, indicating "mixed or average reviews". Audiences polled by CinemaScore gave the film an average grade of "A" on an A+ to F scale.

Film critic Roger Ebert gave the film three stars out of four and praised the vocal performances of Burton and Weaver, especially Burton's, though he expressed surprise for not having the two actors sing any of the movie's songs. Peter Bradshaw of The Guardian published a negative review by calling the film a "completely uninspired cartoon sequel", dismissing it as a very dull retread of the original film.

Accolades
Breslin was nominated for a 2003 Young Artist Award as Best Performance in a Voice-Over Role at the 24th Young Artist Awards.

Home media
Return to Never Land was released on VHS and DVD on August 20, 2002, and it took in only lukewarm sales. In November 2007, the film was released in a "Pixie-Powered Edition" and was also released in a Peter Pan trilogy, along with the Peter Pan Platinum Edition and Tinker Bell in December 2008.

The film was released on Blu-ray in August 2013, after the first Blu-ray release of Peter Pan. It was reprinted on Blu-ray in June 2018 as a Disney Movie Club Exclusive.

References

External links

 
 
 
 
 
 

Peter Pan (franchise)
Peter Pan films
2002 direct-to-video films
American direct-to-video films
2002 animated films
2000s fantasy adventure films
2000s American animated films
2000s English-language films
American children's animated adventure films
American children's animated fantasy films
American fantasy adventure films
American sequel films
Animated adventure films
Animated films based on children's books
Battle of Britain films
DisneyToon Studios animated films
Films about fairies and sprites
Films scored by Joel McNeely
American films based on plays
Films directed by Donovan Cook
Films set in 1940
Films about families
Animated films set in London
Walt Disney Pictures films
2000s children's fantasy films
Disney Television Animation films
2000s children's animated films
2002 directorial debut films